Play DJ was a text-in quiz show which aired weekdays from 6 pm and weekends from 10 am on the now defunct British ITV Play channel. The show replaced a similar programme called ITV Playalong which was aired as filler on ITV Play when no live presented programmes were being aired (and continued to do so late-nights until the channel's demise). Viewers could also send in messages to be displayed on-air in a chatbox.

Games

Buzz Words
Nine letters were given and the viewer had to find as many words as they could with the letters; there was also one nine-letter word that could be made with the letters. If a player got the word first, they got double points for it. A "mini" version was often played on the relaunched Play DJ.

Izit?
A phrase with blanks was given and viewers had to quickly guess what words filled in the blanks.

Quiz Time
Five questions were presented and viewers texted in their answers. Players scored more points based on how quick they answered. During the Playalong period until the debut of the Bonus Ball Bonanza, winners won £10 if they had the highest score.

Games only played on Playalong

String 'Em In
Letters were displayed on a grid, and viewers had to create words using letters that touched. There were often bonuses for using uncommon letters such as Q and Z, and there were also "bonus letters" which could award more points if used. High scoring words were usually replaced by new letters.

Space Wars
Space Wars debuted on 7 August 2006. To shoot at enemies, the viewers texted in an angle (0°-360°) and a missile was shot out of the base at that angle. The player's screen name was shown above the missile so they would know which missile was theirs. If an enemy was hit, points were scored.

Prizes
After each game, a high scoring player was transferred to play a game live in the studio. The player was guaranteed a prize of £20 (£30 on Play DJ Late), but could also win to win up to £1000.

During the day, players were selected using a drawing, while on Play DJ Late, the "Wheel of Wonga" was used to select a player.

Bonus Ball Bonanza
The Bonus Ball Bonanza was the bonus game used on ITV Playalong. High scoring players were sent five numbers in a text message, and a lottery drawing was held on air with 25 numbers.

ITV Playalong Live
For three months prior to Play DJ'''s launch in November 2006, a spin-off began airing called Playalong Live. The show was the same, but it featured a live voiceover presented by Nigel Mitchell. Ideas from this period (such as the presenter and a live chat box which was introduced) were later rolled into Play DJ''.

Former presenters
 Nigel Mitchell – former DJ on Capital Disney, and former presenter of Disney Channel UK.
 Ruth Frances – Former presenter of Quiz Call and Sky Sports.
 Mark Ryes – Former Bid TV presenter and radio DJ.
 Amy Garcia – Former presenter of Disney Channel UK, Chase-It and Quiz TV.
 Emma Lee – Former presenter of The Great Big British Quiz and Disney Channel UK.
 Tim Dixon – Former presenter of Quiz Nation and The Great Big British Quiz.

ITV (TV network) original programming
Phone-in quiz shows